Bachinagudda is in Pattadakal, Bagalkot District in Karnataka, about 20 km from Badami, the Pre-Chalukya historical place and Archaeological sites in Karnataka.  During 2003-04 and 2004-05 excavations was conducted at the cluster of four mounds (at the foot of Bachinagudda hill), the Lower Terrace, Middle Terrace, Upper Terrace and Reserve Forest. at Bachinagudda there is a Shankaralinga Temple.

Lower Terrace
At Lower Terrace found the evidence of early Medieval period brick temple (of Pre-Chalukya) including sandstone Chaturmukha Shiva head. From the remains temple found a cell on the west side and mandapa hall with 16 pillars, on the east side an entrance platform.

Middle Terrace
At the Middle Terrace found the evidence of Iron age - Megalithic habitation (at the depth of 1.15 m) for the first time, 
including floors in good condition.

Upper Terrace
At the Upper Terrace found the evidence of early historic includes  the deposit fire places with ash-pits, rammed floor, consisting of roads,  dumping area of waste products and smelting activity area. Iron and copper alloy implements, beads of semi-precious stones and glass.  Pottery (russet coated ware, red polished ware and rouletted ware). The lead and copper coins were recovered from the floor levels, of the Maharathis and Satavahanas period.

See also 

 Pattadakal
 Badami
 Mahakuta
 Sidlaphadi

References 

Buildings and structures in Bagalkot district
Archaeological sites in Karnataka
Former populated places in India
Tourist attractions in Bagalkot district